"Caroline" is a song by British singer and songwriter Kirsty MacColl, released in 1995 as a single from her compilation album Galore. The song was written by MacColl, and produced by Victor Van Vugt and MacColl. "Caroline" reached number 58 in the UK Singles Chart and remained in the top 100 for two weeks.

Background
MacColl wrote "Caroline" in the early 1990s. She chose not to include the song on her 1994 album Titanic Days as she felt it sounded more like her older work and was not in keeping with the rest of the album's material.

The song's lyrics were inspired by Dolly Parton's "Jolene", and is written from the point of view of the Jolene character. MacColl told The Lennox Herald in 1995, "Basically it's Jolene's reply. I just didn't think that there were that many songs where the third party in that eternal triangle gets her shot at replying. Songs are usually written from the man's point of view of the woman that he's gone off with." She added of the Caroline character's situation in the song, "She's embarrassed because he's not worth it." MacColl added to The Morning Call: "A lot of the songs I heard growing up were written by men for women. There was a lot of, 'Oh, I can't live without my man.' I don't write songs about women as victims. I think it's been done to death."

Critical reception
On its release, Andrew Hirst of the Huddersfield Daily Examiner wrote, "Not her finest moment, but it's still pretty good. Kirsty is the mistress of folk-blessed pop and has a voice to match her rich melodies." The Paisley Daily Express commented, "Another typically Kirsty MacColl single, jangly, upbeat, but ultimately a non-event." In the US, Larry Flick of Billboard stated, "Loosely intended as an Irish-cultured takeoff on Dolly Parton's "Jolene," MacColl swings back into action with tongue placed firmly in cheek. Track has a toe-tapping acoustic tone that frames her vocal to maximum effect."

In a review of Galore, Roch Parisien of the Times Colonist considered the song "perhaps [McColl's] most potent, direct pop-rock construction yet". Joe Szczechowski of The News Journal felt it was a "bright, acoustic-based rocker" and Mike Boehm of the Los Angeles Times described it as "catchy". Patrick Davitt of The Leader-Post considered the song "excellent pop" with a "strong hint of the "California Sound"." In a retrospective review of the song, Stewart Mason of AllMusic commented: "A remarkable song both lyrically and musically, it's one of MacColl's biggest triumphs. A country-tinged pop song filled with ultra-jangly guitars and breathy harmonies, [it has] a chorus that Marshall Crenshaw would kill to have written."

Track listing
7-inch single
"Caroline" – 2:56
"Irish Cousin" – 4:49

CD single (UK release)
"Caroline" – 2:56
"El Paso" – 3:49
"My Affair" (Ladbroke Groove Mix) – 6:08

CD single (UK release)
"Caroline" – 2:56
"Irish Cousin" – 4:49
"New England" – 3:31
"The Butcher Boy" – 3:57

CD single (UK promo)
"Caroline" – 2:56
"The Butcher Boy" – 3:57

CD single (US promo)
"Caroline" – 2:56

Personnel
 Kirsty MacColl – producer of "Caroline", "Irish Cousin", "El Paso" and "The Butcher Boy"
 Victor Van Vugt – producer of "Caroline"
 Boz Boorer – producer of "Irish Cousin" and "The Butcher Boy"
 Colin Stuart – producer of "El Paso"
 Steve Lillywhite – producer of "New England" and "My Affair"
 Howard Gray – remix of "My Affair"

Charts

References

1995 songs
1995 singles
Kirsty MacColl songs
Songs written by Kirsty MacColl
Virgin Records singles